Rogério Dutra Silva was the defending champion but lost in the quarterfinals to Carlos Gómez-Herrera.

Marco Cecchinato won the title after defeating Gómez-Herrera 1–6, 6–1, 6–1 in the final.

Seeds

Draw

Finals

Top half

Bottom half

References
Main Draw
Qualifying Draw

Challenger ATP Cachantún Cup - Singles
2018 Singles